This is the discography for American rock music ensemble Los Lonely Boys.

Albums

Studio albums

Live albums

Holiday albums

Compilation albums

Singles

Music videos

DVDs 

 Texican Style (2004) (Platinum)
 Los Lonely Boys: Live at the Filmore (2004)
 Cottonfields and Crossroads (2007)

Other contributions 

 Eklektikos Live (2005) - "Velvet Sky"
 Instant Karma: The Amnesty International Campaign to Save Darfur (2007, Warner Bros.) - "Whatever Gets You thru the Night"

References 

Discographies of American artists
Rock music group discographies